Trinchesia kanga is a species of sea slug, an aeolid nudibranch, a marine gastropod mollusc in the family Trinchesiidae.

Distribution
This species was described from the President's Jetty, Dar es Salaam, Tanzania. It has been reported from Réunion Island.

Description 
The typical adult size of this species is 5 mm. It has been reported to grow to 12 mm.

References 

 Gosliner, T. 1987. Nudibranchs of southern Africa: A guide to Opisthobranch molluscs of southern Africa Sea. Challengers, Monterey.

External links
 McDonald, G. R. (2009). Nudibranch Systematic Index, second edition. University of California Santa Cruz: Institute of Marine Sciences

Trinchesiidae
Gastropods described in 1970